The Air Force Intelligence, Surveillance and Reconnaissance Agency (Air Force ISR Agency or AFISRA) was until 29 September 2014 a field operating agency of the United States Air Force headquartered at Lackland Air Force Base, Texas. On that date it was redesignated Twenty-Fifth Air Force and aligned as a numbered air force (NAF) of the Air Combat Command.

Its primary mission was to provide intelligence, surveillance and reconnaissance (ISR) products, applications, capabilities and resources, to include cyber and geospatial forces and expertise.  Additionally, it was the service cryptologic component (SCC) responsible to the National Security Agency and Central Security Service for Air Force cryptographic activities.

Originally called the United States Air Force Security Service, the Air Force ISR Agency was activated on 20 October 1948, at Arlington Hall, Washington, D.C., with a mission of cryptology and communications security.

AFISRA was last commanded by Major General John Shanahan. Its Command Chief Master Sergeant was Chief Master Sergeant Arleen Heath. Both continued in their positions upon the creation of 25 AF.

Overview
The agency organizes, trains, equips, presents, and deploys assigned forces and capabilities to conduct intelligence, surveillance and reconnaissance for combatant commanders and the nation. It also implements and oversees the execution of Air Force policies intended to expand ISR capabilities.

The agency's 17,000 people serve at about 65 locations worldwide.

On 14 July 2014, the Secretary and Chief of Staff of the Air Force announced that the Air Force ISR Agency would be reorganized into the Twenty-Fifth Air Force (25 AF), a numbered air force assigned to Air Combat Command, on 1 October 2014.

Units

Assigned units
Two active duty wings, one group, and two centers were assigned to the Air Force ISR Agency.

Wings
 70th Intelligence, Surveillance and Reconnaissance Wing, Fort George G. Meade, Maryland
 480th Intelligence, Surveillance and Reconnaissance Wing, Langley Field, Virginia

Groups
 361st Intelligence, Surveillance and Reconnaissance Group, Hurlburt Field, Florida

Centers
 Air Force Technical Applications Center, Patrick Air Force Base, Florida
 National Air and Space Intelligence Center, Wright-Patterson Air Force Base, Ohio

Supported units
AFISRA is responsible for mission management and support of signals intelligence operations for one Numbered Air Force and three wings.

Numbered Air Forces
 Sixteenth Air Force, Lackland Air Force Base, Texas

Wings
 9th Reconnaissance Wing, Beale Air Force Base, California
 55th Wing, Offutt Air Force Base, Nebraska
 432d Wing, Creech Air Force Base, Nevada

Air National Guard units
 102d Intelligence Wing, Otis Air National Guard Base, Massachusetts
 181st Intelligence Wing, Terre Haute Air National Guard Base, Indiana
 184th Intelligence Wing, McConnell Air Force Base, Kansas

History

United States Air Force Security Service
The Air Force ISR Agency was established as the United States Air Force Security Service (USAFSS) on 20 October 1948. The service was headquartered at Arlington Hall, a former girls' school and the headquarters of the United States Army's Signals Intelligence Service (SIS) cryptography effort during World War II.  The USAFSS was tasked with the cryptology and communications security missions of the newly formed United States Air Force.  The USAFSS moved to Brooks Air Force Base, in San Antonio, Texas, in April 1949, and then to "Security Hill" at nearby Kelly Air Force Base in August 1953.

During the Korean War, the USAFSS personnel provided United Nations Command units with intelligence on the movements of major Korean People's Army forces from Manchuria to Wonsan.  USAFSS personnel received Korean Language training at Yale University, and flew on the Douglas C-47 Skytrain to relay communications to allied ground forces on the Korean Peninsula.

During the early days of the Cold War, USAFSS crews flew missions on several aircraft converted for intelligence missions, including the Boeing B-29 Superfortress, the Lockheed C-130A-II Combat Talon, and the Strategic Air Command's Boeing RB-50 Superfortress and Boeing RC-135.  The USAFSS established communications stations in Germany, Pakistan, the Philippines, and Scotland, and later installed AN/FLR-9 "Elephant Cage" radar sites in Alaska, England, Italy, Japan, the Philippines, and Turkey.

The USAFSS became involved in the Vietnam War when the Pacific Air Forces asked it to establish an Air Force Special Security Office at Tan Son Nhut Airport near Saigon in 1961.  By the following year, a USAFSS squadron and three subordinate detachments were operating in Vietnam and Thailand, and USAFSS personnel supported College Eye threat warning operations.  USAFSS crews also flew on Douglas EC-47 Skytrain missions to search for aircrew shot down in North Vietnam and additional SAC RC-135s deployed to Kadena Air Base, Japan.

Electronic Security Command
On 1 August 1979, the Air Force redesignated the USAFSS as the Electronic Security Command (ESC), reflecting the organization's additional mission of improving the Air Force's use of electronic warfare technology in combat.  In 1985, the Air Force tasked ESC with computer security, in addition to its intelligence and electronic warfare missions.

ESC provided intelligence support to the United States invasion of Panama in 1989 and were among the first U.S. military personnel to arrive in Saudi Arabia for the Gulf War.  During that conflict, ESC personnel operated at three different locations in Saudi Arabia and Turkey.

Air Force Intelligence Command
On 1 October 1991, the Air Force redesignated ESC as the Air Force Intelligence Command (AFIC) and consolidated Air Force intelligence functions and resources into a single command.  AFIC merged ESC with the Air Force Foreign Technology Center at Wright-Patterson Air Force Base, Ohio, the Air Special Activities Center at Fort Belvoir, Virginia, and elements of the Air Force Intelligence Agency, Washington D.C.  With the combined missions, AFIC was tasked with intelligence, security, electronic combat, foreign technology, and treaty monitoring.

Air Intelligence Agency
The organization was redesignated again when it became the Air Intelligence Agency on 1 October 1993.  During the 1990s, AIA personnel deployed to support NATO operations during the Bosnian War and Kosovo War, and as part of Operations Southern Watch and Northern Watch in Southwest Asia.

In February 2001, the Air Force assigned AIA to Air Combat Command, where it provided support to combat operations in the War on Terror, the War in Afghanistan, and the Iraq War.

Air Force ISR Agency
In August 2006, General T. Michael Moseley, the Chief of Staff of the United States Air Force, directed that the Air Force intelligence efforts stress intelligence, surveillance and reconnaissance (ISR) capabilities.  AIA was eventually redesignated the Air Force ISR Agency (AFISRA) on 8 June 2007.  The organization change included transforming AFISRA into a field operating agency and reassigning it from Air Combat Command to Headquarters Air Force.  With the change, AFISRA reported to the Air Force Deputy Chief of Staff for Intelligence, Surveillance and Reconnaissance.

Beginning in 2009, AFISRA personnel deployed to Iraq and Afghanistan to support MC-12 aircraft as part of Project LIBERTY.

25th Air Force

In July 2014 the Air Force announced that the Air Force Intelligence Surveillance and Reconnaissance Agency was being realigned from Headquarters Air Force as a Field Operating Agency to become part of a new operational numbered air force under Air Combat Command.  AFISRA became 25th Air Force on 29 September 2014 at a ceremony held at JBSA-Lackland.

Chairman of the Senate Armed Forces committee John McCain would later call this move "a shell game" designed to comply with a DoD requirement to cut excess staff, without actually cutting any positions or saving any money at all.

Lineage
 Established as United States Air Force Security Service on 20 October 1948
 Organized as a major command on 26 October 1948
 Redesignated: Electronic Security Command on 1 August 1979
 Redesignated: Air Force Intelligence Command on 1 October 1991
 Redesignated: Air Intelligence Agency on 1 October 1993
 Redesignated: Air Force Intelligence, Surveillance, and Reconnaissance Agency on 8 June 2007
 Redesignated: Twenty-Fifth Air Force  on 29 September 2014
 Redesignated: Sixteenth Air Force  on 11 October 2019

Assignments
 United States Air Force, 26 October 1948
 Air Combat Command, 1 February 2001
 United States Air Force, 8 June 2007
 Air Combat Command, 29 September 2014

Components

Wings
 6900th Security Wing, Landsberg AB, Germany, 1 August 1954 – Unknown
 6903d Electronic Security Group, Osan AB, Korea
 6910th Electronic Security Wing, Lindsey AS, Germany, 1 July 1981 – 15 July 1988
 6910th Security Wing, Darmstadt, Germany, Unknown – 1 February 1970
 690th Electronic Security Wing, West Berlin, Germany, 15 July 1988 - 12 June 1991
 6913th Security Wing, Bremerhaven, Germany, Unknown – 1968
 6917th Security Wing, San Vito AS, Italy, Unknown – unknown
 6920th Security Wing, Wheeler AFB, Hawaii, 1 November 1958 – Unknown
 6920th Security Wing, Misawa AB, Japan, 1 February 1976 – 1 October 1978
 6921st Security Wing, Misawa AB, Japan, 1 September 1962 – 1 February 1976
 6922d Security Wing, Kadena AB, Okinawa, then Clark AB, Philippines, 1 July 1963 – 28 January 1973
 6933d Security Wing, Karamursel AS, Turkey, 1 July 1963 – April 1970
 6940th Air Base Wing (later 6940th Technical Training Wing and 6940th Security Wing), Goodfellow AFB, TX, 1 October 1958 – 1 July 1978
 6940th Electronic Security Wing, Fort Meade, MD, 1 February 1980 – 1 October 1991
 6944th Security Wing, Offutt AFB, NE, 1 April 1974 – 1 March 1979
 6948th Security Wing, Lackland Annex – Kelly AFB, TX
 6950th Security Wing. RAF Chicksands, UK, 1 July 1963 – 1 April 1970
 6960th Electronic Security Wing, Kelly AFB, TX, 1 January 1980 – 1 October 1986

Centers
 6901st Special Communications Center (later Air Force Special Communications Center, Electronic Warfare Center, Air Force Information Warfare Center, Air Force Information Operations Center), Lackland AFB, Texas, 8 August 1953 – 1 May 2007

Stations
 Arlington Hall, Washington, D.C., 26 October 1948
 Brooks Air Force Base, San Antonio, TX, 18 April 1949
 Kelly Air Force Base (now Kelly Field Annex), San Antonio, TX, 1 August 1953

See also
National Reconnaissance Office
U.S. Air Force Office of Special Investigations

References

External links
 AF ISR Agency Homepage
 AF ISR Agency Fact Sheet
 Four-Digit Organizations Belonging Directly Or Indirectly to Air Force Intelligence, Surveillance, and Reconnaissance Agency Or its Previous Designations

Intelligence, Surveillance and Reconnaissance Agency
United States intelligence agencies
Military units and formations established in 2007
2007 establishments in the United States